Portrait of John C. Calhoun is a circa 1858 oil on canvas portrait painting by Henry F. Darby, now in United States Capitol in Washington, D.C. It is one of the paintings that possibly suffered damage from tear gas and pepper spray during the 2021 storming of the United States Capitol.

The painting portrays John C. Calhoun, who sat for his photograph in Mathew Brady's studio the year before he died in 1850. This portrait has the inscription on the back ”Calhoun / from Life by Darby / H. F. Darby / 1858”, though the "from Life" must refer to the daguerrotype.  Though the photograph was commissioned by Cahoun's daughter Florence Clemson, who accompanied her father to the studio, the painting was commissioned by Brady who considered it one of his prize paintings in his studio. He probably used it to sell both copies of the photograph and as a painted portrait option based on a single sitting. It was purchased from him for the Capitol collection in 1881. Brady said that Henry Darby had made a study for the painting during the sitting for the daguerreotype, but the Senate collection now claims Darby and Brady teamed up by using glass negative copies of the daguerreotypes to project the image onto "sensitized canvas", which could then be over-painted, a reproduction process that didn't need the artist's presence at the sitting. At the time the painting was made, Darby and Brady both had addresses on the same block of Pennsylvania Avenue in Washington, D.C.

The portrait hangs across from the portrait of Charles Sumner, also based on a Brady photograph.  As the man known today for his views on slavery as a positive good in the United States, Calhoun, like his portrait's abolitionist neighbor, would not have approved the confederate flag being flown before his portrait in 2021. According to his Senate address 6 February 1837, he was determined to ward off a possible civil war: "As widely as this incendiary spirit has spread, it has not yet infected this body, or the great mass of the intelligent and business portion of the North; but unless it be speedily stopped, it will spread and work upwards till it brings the two great sections of the Union into deadly conflict. ...Standing at the point of time at which we have now arrived, it will not be more difficult to trace the course of future events now than it was then. They who imagine that the spirit now abroad in the North, will die away of itself without a shock or convulsion, have formed a very inadequate conception of its real character; it will continue to rise and spread, unless prompt and efficient measures to stay its progress be adopted. Already it has taken possession of the pulpit, of the schools, and, to a considerable extent, of the press; those great instruments by which the mind of the rising generation will be formed." Though aware that slavery was morally evil, Calhoun recognized its economic necessity in light of the tariff of 1828 that threatened the Southern states. It was the prospect of destitution for all South Carolinians that caused him to take an extreme position during his South Carolina Exposition and Protest which in turn caused the Nullification crisis. He became a proponent of States' rights as a last resort against civil war, which happened anyway a decade after his death.

References

 painting record on US Senate collection website

Portraits of politicians
1858 paintings
Paintings in the United States Capitol
John C. Calhoun